The China Railways JF (解放, Jiěfàng, "Liberation) class is a name given to a group of classes of steam locomotives for freight trains with 2-8-2 wheel arrangement operated by the China Railway. Originally designated ㄇㄎ壹 (MK1) class by the China Railways in 1951, the present name was assigned to them in 1959.

Composition

The JF group of classes is made up of twenty different classes of 2-8-2 steam locomotives:

 JF1 - 2027 engines; 455 built new after 1950, rest inherited from South Manchuria Railway, Manchukuo National Railway, North China Transport, Central China Railway, and private railways;
 JF2 - 41 engines inherited from the South Manchuria Railway;
 JF3 - 150 engines built in Czechoslovakia and inherited from the Manchukuo National Railway;
 JF4 - 15 engines inherited from the South Manchuria Railway;
 JF5 - inherited from North China Transport, originally built for the Jichang Railway
 JF6 - around 475 engines; 5 built new after 1950, rest inherited from the South Manchuria Railway, the Manchukuo National Railway, and North China Transport;
 JF7 - originally built for the Jingfeng Railway, inherited from North China Transport;
 JF8 - originally built for the Huainan Railway, inherited from the Central China Railway;
 JF9 - 38 engines of the Sentetsu Mikasa class, inherited from the Central China Railway;
 JF10 - 30 engines, US Army Transportation Corps S200 class, given to China as postwar reconstruction aid from the UNRRA;
 JF11 - 70 engines inherited from the Central China Railway, originally built for the Jinpu Railway and the Zhegan Railway;
 JF12 - 46 engines inherited from North China Transport, originally built for the Jingsui Railway as Class 300;
 JF13 - inherited from North China Transport, built in Czechoslovakia in 1939;
 JF15 - 6 engines inherited from the Manchukuo National Railway, originally built for the Jihai Railway;
 JF16 - 18 engines inherited from Central China Railway and the Manchukuo National Railway;
 JF17 - inherited from North China Transport, originally built for the Jiaoji Railway;
 JF18 - around 14 engines inherited from South Manchuria Railway;
 JF21 - inherited from the Central China Railway, originally built for the Yuehan Railway.
 JF51 - inherited from the Yunnan-Vietnam Railway.

The locomotives were used across the Chinese railway system, and were in service on the national railway system until 1996; on industrial rail networks some locomotives remained in use until the early 2000s. Several of the class have been preserved.

Preservation

JF1
JF1-304, JF1-1191, JF1-2101, JF1-2121, JF1-4101: are preserved at the China Railway Museum.
JF1-522: is preserved at Zhan Tianyou Park, Harbin.
JF1-747: is preserved at Huainan Servicing Workshop, Hefei Locomotive Depot, Shanghai Railway Bureau.
JF1-886: is preserved at Hengdaohezi Locomotive Depot, Mudanjiang.
ㄇㄎ1-1115: is preserved at Dandong Korean War Memorial Hall.
JF1-1861: is preserved at Manzhouli.
JF1-2023: is preserved at Linglong Park, Beijing
JF1-2102: is preserved at CSR Sifang Co Ltd.

JF2
JF2-2525: is preserved at Shenyang Railway Museum.

JF3
JF3-2558: is preserved at Shenyang Railway Museum.

JF6
JF6-3022: is preserved at the China Railway Museum.
JF6-3329: is preserved at Shenyang Railway Museum.

JF9
JF9-3673: is preserved at the China Railway Museum.

JF11
JF11-3773: is preserved at the China Railway Museum.
JF11-3787: is preserved at the China Railway Museum.

JF51
JF51-738: is preserved at the China Railway Museum.

References

CRRC Dalian locomotives
CSR Sifang Co Ltd.
Steam locomotives of China
ALCO locomotives
Kawasaki locomotives
Hitachi locomotives
Standard gauge locomotives of China
Railway locomotives introduced in 1918
Freight locomotives